The 2021–22 snooker season was a series of snooker tournaments played from July 2021 to May 2022, including the professional World Snooker Tour but also featuring events for female, senior, and Q School players. The season saw a record five players claim their first professional ranking titles: David Gilbert, Zhao Xintong, Hossein Vafaei, Fan Zhengyi, and Robert Milkins. Nutcharut Wongharuthai won her first World Women's Snooker Championship, becoming the only player besides Reanne Evans and Ng On-yee to win the women's world title in 19 years. Ronnie O'Sullivan won the World Snooker Championship, equalling Stephen Hendry's modern era record of seven world titles and becoming the oldest world champion in snooker history at the age of 46 years and 148 days. Lee Walker won his first World Seniors Championship. 

Neil Robertson, who won four tournaments during the season, was named Player of the Year at the World Snooker Tour Awards. O'Sullivan was named the Snooker Journalists' Player of the Year, while Zhao was the Fans' Player of the Year. O'Sullivan won Performance of the Year for capturing his seventh world title, while Robertson won Magic Moment of the Year for making a maximum break at the Crucible. Evans and Allison Fisher were entered into the Snooker Hall of Fame for outstanding contributions to the growth of snooker.

Players 
The World Snooker Tour in the 2021–22 season consists of a field of 122 professional players. The top 64 players from the prize money rankings after the 2021 World Championship, and 27 of the players who earned a two-year tour card the previous year automatically qualified for the season. Next, eight places were allocated to the top eight on the One Year Ranking List who had not already qualified for the Main Tour. Another four players came from the CBSA China Tour, and a further 14 places were eligible through the Q School (four Event 1 winners, four Event 2 winners, four Event 3 winners, and two from the Order of Merit). Two players from the World Women's Snooker Tour were given tour cards. Andrew Pagett, who won the 2020 EBSA European Championship, had his tour card deferred to this season and was subsequently given a tour card. The last two tour cards were invitational tour cards, given to Marco Fu and Jimmy White.

New professional players 
All players listed below received a tour card for two seasons.

Top 8 players from 2020/2021 One Year Ranking List

CBSA China Tour

World Women's Snooker Tour

Deferred Tour Place

Invitational Tour Card 

Q School
Event 1

Event 2

Event 3

Order of Merit – Top 2

Top-up players 
As a result of the COVID-19 pandemic restricting the number of amateur qualification tournaments that could be run and thus the total size of the Main Tour for this season, World Snooker Tour announced that the following six players are guaranteed an invite to all eligible snooker events this season, alongside amateurs appointed by local governing bodies for the Home Nations Series. This was due to their ranking on the Q School Order of Merit:
  Sanderson Lam
  Michael Georgiou
  Si Jiahui
  Soheil Vahedi
  Michael White
  David Lilley

Calendar 
The following tables outline the dates and results for all the events of the World Snooker Tour, World Women's Snooker, the World Seniors Tour and the Q Tour.

World Snooker Tour

World Women's Snooker

World Seniors Tour

Q-Tour

Other events

World ranking points

The 2021–22 snooker season will feature the following points distribution for World Snooker Tour ranking events:

Notes

References

External links 
 Calendar 2021/2022 at snooker.org

Seasons in snooker
Season 2021
Season 2022